The following is a list of association football  leagues which do not or did not have a promotion and relegation process.

Leagues within the scope of this list are:

Top-tier football leagues with no relegation system
In countries without lower-tier leagues
In countries with lower-tier leagues not integrated to the top-tier league; closed model
Recognized Division II or lower leagues without promotion and relegation.

Excluded are:
Any Division II or lower leagues with promotion but without relegation

Leagues

Current

Top tier leagues

Notes

Lower division leagues

Defunct or inactive

Top tier leagues

Lower division leagues

References

Without promotion and relegation
Football leagues without promotion and relegation
Leagues without promotion and relegation